The Journal of Low Temperature Physics is a biweekly peer-reviewed scientific journal covering the field of low temperature physics and cryogenics, including superconductivity, superfluidity, matter waves, magnetism and electronic properties, active areas in condensed matter physics, and low temperature technology. Occasionally, special issues dedicated to a particular topic are also published. According to the Journal Citation Reports, the journal has a 2020 impact factor of 1.57. The journal was established by John G. Daunt in 1969, and the current Editors-in-Chief are Neil S. Sullivan, Jukka Pekola and Paul Leiderer.

Abstracting and indexing 
The journal is abstracted and indexed in Chemical Abstracts Service, Science Citation Index, and Scopus.

References

External links

English-language journals
Physics journals
Publications established in 1969
Springer Science+Business Media academic journals
Biweekly journals